Jonathan William Hameister-Ries (January 26, 1984 – June 9, 2021) was a professional Canadian football offensive lineman who played for the BC Lions of the Canadian Football League. He was drafted 15th overall by the Lions in the 2006 CFL Draft. He was then signed to the practice roster of the Lions a month later where he spent the remainder of the 2007 CFL season. He played college football for the Tulsa Golden Hurricane. He was released by the Lions on June 16, 2013. He competed in the second season of MasterChef Canada and reached Top 8. Hameister-Ries was a free agent signing of the Arizona Cardinals in May 2007, however, he was released at the end of their training camp on August 30, 2007.

Death
He died on June 9, 2021, at the age of 37.

References

External links
 BC Lions bio

1984 births
2021 deaths
American football offensive linemen
BC Lions players
Arizona Cardinals players
Canadian football offensive linemen
Canadian players of American football
Players of Canadian football from Alberta
Canadian football people from Edmonton
Tulsa Golden Hurricane football players
Canadian television chefs
Canadian male chefs
MasterChef Canada